Billy Kenny may refer to:

Billy Kenny (footballer, born 1951), English footballer who played for Everton F.C. and Tranmere F.C.
Billy Kenny (footballer, born 1973), English footballer who played for Everton F.C. and Oldham Athletic F.C.
Billy Kenny (Australian footballer) (1871–1932), Australian rules footballer who played for South Melbourne
Billy Kenny (artist), British producer, singer, songwriter

See also
Bill Kenny (disambiguation)
William Kenny (disambiguation)